Haruspex is a genus of beetles in the family Cerambycidae, containing these species:

 Haruspex bivittis (White, 1855)
 Haruspex brevipes (White, 1855)
 Haruspex celatus Lane, 1970
 Haruspex daithmus Martins, 1976
 Haruspex inscriptus Gahan, 1895
 Haruspex insulsus Martins & Galileo, 2005
 Haruspex lineolatus Bates, 1870
 Haruspex mentitus Martins, 1976
 Haruspex modestus (White, 1855)
 Haruspex ornatus Bates, 1870
 Haruspex pictilis Martins, 1976
 Haruspex quadripustulatus Gounelle, 1909
 Haruspex submaculatus (White, 1855)

References

Piezocerini